Luca Kronberger (born 15 February 2002) is an Austrian footballer who plays as a midfielder for SV Ried on loan from Sturm Graz.

Club career
On 16 December 2021, Kronberger agreed to join Sturm Graz on a 3.5-year contract.

Career statistics

Club

Notes

References

2002 births
People from St. Johann im Pongau District
Footballers from Salzburg (state)
Living people
Austrian footballers
Austria youth international footballers
Austria under-21 international footballers
Association football midfielders
Austrian Regionalliga players
Austrian Football Bundesliga players
2. Liga (Austria) players
TSV St. Johann im Pongau players
FC Admira Wacker Mödling players
SK Sturm Graz players
SV Ried players